The Slovenian Women's Basketball League is the premier league for women's basketball clubs in Slovenia. Founded in 1991 following the independence of the country, it is contested by eight teams.

ŽKK Celje is the league's most successful team with 18 titles.

2022–23 teams
Akson Ilirija
Cinkarna Celje
Derby Ježica
Domžale
Pro-Bit Konjice
Tosama Ledita
Triglav
VBO Maribor

Champions

List of champions

References

External links
Official website 

league
women
Women's basketball leagues in Europe
Basketball
1991 establishments in Slovenia
Sports leagues established in 1991
Professional sports leagues in Slovenia